Volodymyr Illich Levin (born 1 June 1970) is a Ukrainian politician and businessman. In 2017 he became chairman of Desna Chernihiv.

Biography 
Levin was born in Kyiv and he is a Member of the Kyiv City Council of the VIII convocation (Solidarity faction).Also Member of the Council of Entrepreneurs under the Cabinet of Ministers of Ukraine, member of the Public Council under the Ministry of Finance of Ukraine, Vice-President of the Ukrainian Market, President of the Chernihiv Desna Football Club. He is also a Member of the Standing Committee on Budget and Socio-Economic Development of the Kyiv City Council.

Economic studies
Since 2019, Volodymyr Levin has been working on the technical implementation of Universal Basic Income (UBI). He is currently stating that the war in Ukraine is the perfect opportunity to implement UBI.
He has written 4 papers discussing and explaining how can it be implemented.

Political career
Since 2013, he has been a member of the Council of Entrepreneurs under the Cabinet of Ministers of Ukraine. In addition to working in the Kyiv City Council, the candidate manages several companies, including AF-Leasing LLC, which is listed as his place of work on the CEC website. In 2015, he was elected a deputy of the Kyiv City Council from the BPP Solidarity in 86 constituencies of the Obolon district. Member of the Standing Committee on Budget and Socio-Economic Development.

In 2022 According to Chernihiv Region Events and Comments, Volodymyr Levin, President of Desna Chernihiv, is being considered the main candidate from the Servant of the People in the 206th constituency election. A sociological campaign close to the Servants of the People has already included Volodymyr Levin in the initial poll, which is currently underway in 206 constituencies.

Sports and patronage

In 2017 Levin become the president of Desna Chernihiv. He managed to sign good players for the club like the Estonian international Joonas Tamm, the experience goalkeepr Yevhen Past and bring the club to the Ukrainian Premier League. Furthermore, the team got into the Europa League third qualifying round for the first time in the history of the club. He also managed to sells the striker Oleksandr Filippov for 1.5 million of euro, becoming the most expensive player sold by the club, with some Italian clubs interested on the player. On 31 May 2021, the Ukrainian Premier League congratulates with him during his birthday and also for his achievement and greatest as president of Desna Chernihiv with results in history of growing from year to year of the club of Chernihiv. In summer 2021, due to the difficult financial situation of the club Volodymyr Levin addressed the club with a serious task. He said that the club has a 4-month debt to the players for the payment of salaries and the management of the UPL club decided to cut the budget for the 2021/22 season. A number of players have left Desna. He also said that "Don't worry about Desna. Everything is fine. Desna will play, and not worse than last season. Desna has decided on sparring partners in the off-season Desna has decided on sparring partner sminamines. Desna, in addition to playing this season and do your best to choose players and build the team. The task of the club is to look at the future of football in Chernihiv region, "Levin said in a comment to Tribuna. The club started very well the season 2021-22 with four winning matches in row look solid and strong and Volodymyr Levin explained the difficult task that he and his staff had to do after failing the qualification of the Europe League and Conference League, selling also 15 players and get 13 more new once on the team. On 27 September 2021, the president spoke about the situation with the wage arrears of the players in the club and confirmed that the wages started to be paid and also the wage arrears ensuring that no one has problems. He state that Desna is one big friendly family, which we play football. In december 2021, he defined Oleksandr Ryabokon, one of the best UPL of Ukrainian Premier League. In February 2022, after he made public is candidacy for the Servant of the People in the 206th constituency election, he said that his task is to build a Yuri Gagarin Stadium in Chernihiv. In May 2022 in a meeting of UPL clubs asked to support the Chernihiv club in the 2022/23 season after the russian aggression. He also confirmed that the leadership of the club will not give up and that the main plan is to build a children's academy and training fields, restore the team. He thanks the Armed Forces for the liberation from the invaders of Chernihiv Oblast and the opportunity to begin its restoration. Glory to Ukraine, "Levin said.

See also
 Kyiv City Council
 European Solidarity
 Servant of the People
 FC Desna Chernihiv

References

External links
 Official Site FC Desna Chernihiv
 Official Website

1970 births
Living people
FC Desna Chernihiv presidents
Politicians from Kyiv
Businesspeople from Kyiv
Ukrainian football chairmen and investors
Taras Shevchenko National University of Kyiv alumni
Party of Regions politicians
Petro Poroshenko Bloc politicians
20th-century Ukrainian businesspeople
21st-century Ukrainian businesspeople